Kamare may refer to:

Kamare, Afghanistan, a village in Jaghori District, Afghanistan
The Girls of Kamare = Les Filles de Kamare, a 1974 French film

See also
 Kamares (disambiguation)